Jutro u fabrici is an EP by the Serbian noise-rock band Klopka Za Pionira, released in 2005 (see 2005 in music) on the Ne-ton independent label. The album has only one instrumental song of harsh noise consisting of industrial noises and loops treated electronically with many effects.


Track listing
All  music by Klopka Za Pionira

"Jutro u fabrici" – 15:08

References

External links 
 

Klopka Za Pionira albums
2005 EPs